Andreas Pyndt Andersen (born 4 March 2001) is a Danish professional footballer who plays as a midfielder for Hvidovre IF, on loan from Danish Superliga club Brøndby IF. He has represented Denmark at youth level.

Club career

Brøndby

Youth career 
Pyndt began his career at hometown club Allerød FK, before moving to Brøndby IF in 2011. As part of the under-12 side, he won the REWE Stockhausen Junior Cup 2012 in Germany by beating Bayer 04 Leverkusen in the finals on penalties, after having earlier beaten youth teams of Werder Bremen, Fortuna Düsseldorf, VfL Wolfsburg and Hannover 96. In October 2017, Pyndt signed a three-year contract extension with Brøndby.

In May 2020, Pyndt was announced as a part of the new Brøndby under-20 team, which was announced by director of football Carsten V. Jensen. He received a one-year contract extension as part of the new team, alongside fellow under-19 graduates Emil Staugaard, Jacob Rasmussen and Jagvir Singh. At that point, Pyndt was captain of the under-19 team.

First team 
Pyndt made his first appearance for the Brøndby first team on 22 November 2018, as a second-half substitute in a 4–1 Danish Cup win over BK Marienlyst.

On 17 December 2020, Pyndt made his second first-team appearance, coming on as a substitute in extra time for Hjörtur Hermannsson as Brøndby lost 1–2 to Fremad Amager in the Danish Cup.

Pyndt made his European debut on 17 August 2021 in the UEFA Champions League play-off first leg against Red Bull Salzburg, which ended in a 2–1 loss.

Loan to B.93
On 31 January 2022, Pyndt was loaned out to Danish 2nd Division club B.93 for the rest of the season. Pyndt made a total of 12 appearances for the club, where he also scored one goal.

Loan to Hvidovre
After returning from a recent loan spell, Pyndt was loaned out again; this time to Danish 1st Division side Hvidovre IF for one year. The deal was confirmed on 14 July 2022. He made his Hvidovre debut on 24 July, the first matchday of the season, starting in a 2–2 away draw against Næstved. His first goal for the club came on 5 August, slotting home by the near post to score the opener in a 3–1 home win over Hillerød Fodbold. He scored again in the following league match on 13 August as Hvidovre defeated Helsingør IF 3–0 away.

International career 
Pyndt has won seven caps for Denmark at under-16 level and 11 caps at under-17 level.

Career statistics

Honours 
Brøndby
 Danish Superliga: 2020–21

References

External links 

2001 births
Living people
Danish men's footballers
Denmark youth international footballers
Association football midfielders
People from Allerød Municipality
Allerød FK players
Brøndby IF players
Boldklubben af 1893 players
Hvidovre IF players
Danish Superliga players
Danish 1st Division players
Danish 2nd Division players
Sportspeople from the Capital Region of Denmark